Ernest Albert Lee (19 August 1879 – 14 January 1958) was an English professional footballer who played in the 1902 FA Cup final for Southampton, and also made one appearance for England on 29 February 1904 against Wales. He also played for Dundee, winning the Scottish Cup in 1910.

Honours
Southampton
 FA Cup finalist: 1902
 Southern League championship: 1900–01, 1902–03, 1903–04

Dundee
Scottish Cup winner: 1910

References

England profile

External links

Profile on englandfootballonline
Photo of Dundee F.C. Scottish Cup winning team of 1910
Video of Lee training with Southampton in 1934

1879 births
People from Bridport
Footballers from Dorset
1958 deaths
English footballers
England international footballers
Association football wing halves
Poole Town F.C. players
Southampton F.C. players
Dundee F.C. players
Southern Football League players
Scottish Football League players
FA Cup Final players